Jan Mathiasen (born 1957) is a Danish competitive sailor and Olympic medalist. He won a bronze medal in the Soling class at the 1988 Summer Olympics in Seoul, together with Jesper Bank and Steen Secher.

References

1957 births
Living people
Danish male sailors (sport)
Sailors at the 1984 Summer Olympics – Soling
Sailors at the 1988 Summer Olympics – Soling
Olympic sailors of Denmark
Olympic bronze medalists for Denmark
Olympic medalists in sailing
Medalists at the 1988 Summer Olympics